Abderrahmane Bacha (born 21 December 1999) is an Algerian professional footballer who plays for USM Khenchela, on loan from USM Alger in the Algerian Ligue Professionnelle 1.

Club career
In 2022, he joined USM Alger.
In 2023, he signed a loan contract with USM Khenchela.

References

External links

1999 births
Living people
Algerian footballers
USM Alger players